People's Liberty is a liberal political party in Peru. Founded in 2022, the party is led by Pedro Cateriano, former Prime Minister of Peru from 2015 to 2016 and briefly in 2020.

The party is currently undergoing its registration process at the National Jury of Elections in order to participate in the next general election.

See also 
 Liberty Movement
 Pedro Cateriano

References

External links 
 

2022 establishments in Peru
Liberal parties in Peru
Liberal parties in South America
Political parties established in 2022
Political parties in Peru